Charles Rihoux (born 7 March 1998) is a French swimmer. He competed in the men's 100 metre freestyle event at the 2020 European Aquatics Championships, in Budapest, Hungary.

References

External links
 

1998 births
Living people
French male freestyle swimmers
Sportspeople from Reims
Swimmers at the 2020 Summer Olympics
Olympic swimmers of France
20th-century French people
21st-century French people
Mediterranean Games medalists in swimming
Mediterranean Games silver medalists for France
Mediterranean Games bronze medalists for France
Swimmers at the 2022 Mediterranean Games
European Aquatics Championships medalists in swimming